The list of shipwrecks in 1814 includes ships sunk, wrecked or otherwise lost during 1814.

January

1 January

2 January

3 January

4 January

5 January

6 January

7 January

8 January

9 January

10 January

11 January

12 January

13 January

14 January

15 January

16 January

17 January

18 January

19 January

20 January

21 January

22 January

24 January

25 January

27 January

28 January

29 January

30 January

31 January

Unknown date

February

2 February

3 February

4 February

5 February

8 February

9 February

10 February

11 February

12 February

13 February

14 February

15 February

16 February

18 February

20 February

21 February

22 February

23 February

24 February

25 February

27 February

28 February

Unknown date

March

1 March

2 March

3 March

4 March

5 March

7 March

8 March

9 March

10 March

11 March

15 March

16 March

19 March

20 March

21 March

23 March

24 March

25 March

30 March

31 March

Unknown date

April

1 April

2 April

3 April

4 April

5 April

7 April

8 April

12 April

15 April

16 April

19 April

20 April

23 April

24 April

25 April

27 April

28 April

30 April

Unknown date

May

1 May

2 May

3 May

4 May

5 May

6 May

8 May

9 May

13 May

16 May

19 May

20 May

21 May

22 May

23 May

28 May

31 May

Unknown date

June

2 June

3 June

9 June

13 June

14 June

15 June

16 June

17 June

18 June

21 June

22 June

23 June

24 June

26 June

28 June

30 June

Unknown date

July

2 July

3 July

4 July

5 July

6 July

8 July

9 July

11 July

18 July

19 July

20 July

21 July

22 July

23 July

24 July

25 July

26 July

27 July

28 July

29 July

30 July

Unknown date

August

1 August

3 August

6 August

7 August

8 August

10 August

11 August

12 August

14 August

19 August

20 August

21 August

22 August

23 August

24 August

25 August

26 August

27 August

28 August

29 August

30 August

Unknown date

September

1 September

2 September

3 September

4 September

5 September

8 September

9 September

10 September

11 September

12 September

13 September

14 September

15 September

17 September

18 September

19 September

20 September

21 September

23 September

24 September

25 September

27 September

28 September

30 September

Unknown date

October

1 October

2 October

3 October

4 October

6 October

7 October

8 October

9 October

10 October

11 October

12 October

13 October

14 October

15 October

16 October

17 October

18 October

19 October

20 October

22 October

23 October

24 October

25 October

27 October

29 October

31 October

Unknown date

November

2 November

4 November

5 November

7 November

8 November

9 November

10 November

11 November

12 November

13 November

14 November

15 November

16 November

17 November

18 November

19 November

20 November

21 November

22 November

23 November

24 November

25 November

26 November

27 November

28 November

29 November

Unknown date

December

1 December

2 December

3 December

4 December

5 December

6 December

7 December

8 December

9 December

10 December

11 December

12 December

13 December

14 December

15 December

16 December

17 December

18 December

19 December

20 December

21 December

22 December

23 December

24 December

25 December

26 December

27 December

28 December

29 December

30 December

31 December

Unknown date

Unknown date

References

1814